Sanhe is a town in south-central Anhui province, People's Republic of China. , it administered 14 residential communities and 12 villages.

Name
The name of the town literally means 'Three Rivers', referring to the Fengle, Hangbu, and Xiaonan Rivers.

History

The area around the town was the scene of the 1858 Battle of Sanhe during the Taiping Revolt against the Qing.

Divisions
Within its borders lies the Sanhe Old Town, which occupies more than 41% of the town's population and yet only  of the area, and for this reason is one of the nationally designated historical and cultural towns.

Transport
The Anhui Provincial Road 103, running from Tongling to Hefei, passes through the area.

See also
List of township-level divisions of Anhui

References

Towns in Anhui
Feixi County